Attagirl may refer to:
 
 Attagirl (album), a 2005 album by the Dutch band Bettie Serveert
 Attagirl (TV series), a Philippine sitcom
 Attagirl Press, a short fiction publisher
Attagirl, nickname for female pilots in the UK Air Transport Auxiliary (1940–45)